In geometry, visibility is a mathematical abstraction of the real-life notion of visibility.

Given a set of obstacles in the Euclidean space, two points in the space are said to be visible to each other, if the line segment that joins them does not intersect any obstacles. (In the Earth's atmosphere light follows a slightly curved path that is not perfectly predictable, complicating the calculation of actual visibility.)

Computation of visibility is among the basic problems in computational geometry and has applications in  computer graphics, motion planning, and other areas.

Concepts and problems
Point visibility
Edge visibility
Visibility polygon
Weak visibility
Art gallery problem or museum problem
Visibility graph
Visibility graph of vertical line segments
Watchman route problem
Computer graphics applications:
Hidden surface determination
Hidden line removal
z-buffering
portal engine
Star-shaped polygon
Kernel of a polygon
Isovist
Viewshed
Zone of Visual Influence
Painter's algorithm

References

 Chapter 15: "Visibility graphs"

External links

Software
VisiLibity: A free open source C++ library of floating-point visibility algorithms and supporting data types

Geometry
Geometric algorithms